The Canadian Arrow was a privately funded, early-2000s rocket and space tourism project concept founded by London, Ontario, Canada entrepreneurs Geoff Sheerin, Dan McKibbon and Chris Corke. The project's objective was to take the first civilians into space, on a vertical sub-orbital spaceflight reaching an altitude of 112 km.

Canadian Arrow was considered one of the top three candidates for the X-Prize competition, along with Scaled Composites (Burt Rutan), and Armadillo Aerospace (John Carmack). Scaled Composites won the competition on October 4, 2004.

The Canadian Arrow team's motto was "making SPACE for you". They have completed the first series of tests on their 57,000 lbf (254 kN) thrust engine and have built a space training centre and a full-scale mock-up of their rocket.  After an open nomination process, they also recruited a team of six astronauts from around the world, including several seasoned military pilots and a NASA trained astronaut from Ukraine. Astronaut candidates – the group "Arrow Six" includes David Ballinger, Ted Gow, Terry Wong, Jason Dyer, Larry Clark and Yaroslav "Yarko" Pustovyi, the only member of the team with actual space training.

In November 2010 Geoff Sheerin, the president of Canadian Arrow stated the company is unlikely to fly a Canadian Arrow rocket as a space tourism vehicle.

Design

The Canadian Arrow is a 16.5 m tall two-stage rocket, where the second stage is a three-person space capsule. The Canadian Arrow team's somewhat conservative approach has been to base the design of their rocket engine and aerodynamics on the well proven V-2 design from WWII.

First stage
The rocket's first stage is 10.2 m long and 1.7 m in diameter.  It is propelled by a single liquid fuel rocket engine. It produces a thrust of 254 kN. Graphite jet vanes are used for stabilisation before the rocket has reached a velocity high enough for the four fins to be effective. About one minute after ignition, the fuel is depleted and the engine shuts off.

Second stage
The rocket's second stage is 6 m long and 1.7 m in diameter at the base. It carries three astronauts and is propelled by four JATO-type solid rocket engines. These are ignited immediately after stage separation, and will carry the capsule to an altitude of ~112 km. Cold gas jets were planned to be used for attitude control.

Crew Cabin Escape System
The design proposed four solid rocket engines in the second stage that could be fired at any time, even when the rocket stands on its launch pad. This constitutes an escape system, which can, in a case of an emergency, quickly separate the second stage from the rocket and propel it to an altitude of 1.5 km, where its parachutes can be deployed.

Rocket engine
The rocket engine was to use alcohol and liquid oxygen as propellants, and produces a maximum thrust of 254 kN, and burns for 55 s. It is constructed of low carbon steel, with propellant injectors made out of brass.

Flight profile
The Canadian Arrow rocket will launch vertically from the ground. Initial thrust is ~75.5 kN, but the rocket quickly reaches maximum thrust. After 55 s, the propellant is depleted and stage separation occurs. The solid fuel rockets in the second stage are ignited and boosts it up to an altitude of ~112 km, where the crew and passengers will experience a few minutes of "zero-G", or weightlessness.

After stage separation the first stage reaches an apogee of over 80 km before descent begins. Four parachutes slow the Canadian Arrow's first stage down before splashdown occurs at a speed of ~9 m/s, after which recovery of the spacecraft can take place.

During descent, the crew cabin (the second stage) was planned to use a ballute to reduce its speed. When its velocity becomes subsonic, the second stage's ballute was to be released and pull out the three parachutes before splashdown.

Testing

Summer, 2002: Single burner cup engine test.
October 5, 2002: The rocket test stand complete.
November 7, 2003: First engine tests conducted.
August 14, 2004: Canadian Arrow carries out a successful drop test of the crew cabin, to test the parachutes and recovery routines.

Funding, commercial aspects and the future
Canadian Arrow started as a team competing in the international X-Prize competition, with the ultimate goal of continuing past the X-Prize into the commercial sector providing private access to space. Funding during the X-Prize was provided by sponsorship and private investment.
In early 2003 the company would receive a major infusion of financial support by Canadian Arrow partner and Director of Spacecraft Development - Lou van Amelsvoort.
As a result, during the next two years The company would also proceed to open the world's first private Astronaut training facility, continue vehicle development, and test propulsion and recovery systems.

Geoff Sheerin, president and CEO of Canadian Arrow, and Dr. Chirinjeev Kathuria announced on May 17, 2005, the creation of PlanetSpace Corporation. It is through this enterprise that Canadian Arrow will complete the construction of their space craft, and within 24 months offer suborbital space flight to aspiring space tourists. Planetspace expects to fly about 2,000 new astronauts within five years of operation. The price is expected to be $250,000 for each flight, including fourteen days of training. Cape Breton Island, in Nova Scotia is being considered as a launch site, and a contract has been signed with the government of Nova Scotia to provide  of land for the project.

A requirement of the X-Prize for each participating company was to propose other possible markets for their spacecraft.  Canadian Arrow coined the term "Spacediving", while investigating the possible use of Canadian Arrow spacecraft for a high altitude version of skydiving.

On November 11, 2005, Canadian Arrow teamed up with former X-Prize competitor Romanian aerospace company, ARCASPACE, to develop privately built spacecraft.

On December 15, 2005 PlanetSpace Corporation unveiled plans for an orbital commercial vehicle capable of carrying eight passengers.  This vehicle to be called the Silver Dart is based on the U.S. Air Force's Flight Dynamics Laboratory-7 lifting body program from the 1970s.
PlanetSpace Corporation defunct as of 6 February 2013

On June 21, 2013, Blackburn news reported that the full scale engineering mock-up of the Canadian Arrow rocket was purchased by Sarnia Ontario's Preferred Towing. Having spent several years at Chris Hadfield Airport in Sarnia, Ontario, Preferred Towing expressed interest in hopes of restoring the rocket for display in Sarnia.  This plan has since been scrapped and the mock-up no longer exists.

Picture gallery

See also
 Armadillo Aerospace
 CORONA
 Interorbital Systems
 Kankoh-maru
 List of private spaceflight companies - A compiled list of private spaceflight companies
 Lunar Lander Challenge
 Masten Space Systems
 McDonnell Douglas DC-X
 Project VR-190 - Proposed manned sub-orbital spaceflight
 Project Morpheus NASA program to continue developing ALHAT and Q­ landers
 Quad (rocket)
 Reusable Vehicle Testing program by JAXA
 SpaceX reusable launch system development program
 Terry Wong, pilot
 Zarya

References and notes

External links
 Planetspace Corporation
 Canadian Arrow Space Centre Bus Tours
 Canadian Arrow at Astronautix.com

Private spaceflight companies
Space launch vehicles of Canada
Companies based in London, Ontario
Former proposed space launch system concepts
Ansari X Prize
Defunct spaceflight companies
Space industry companies of Canada